National Skills University Islamabad (commonly referred to as NSU), is a degree awarding institution upgraded from a TVET institution formerly known as National Institute of Science and Technical Education. NSU is a non-profit, public sector university established by Federal Government of Pakistan under the National Skills University Islamabad Act, 2017.

NSU is recognized by HEC and is accredited by National Technology Council. Internationally, NSU is also a part of UNESCO/UNEVOC network member.

History 
In 1985 and 1989, the Federal Government of Pakistan established the National Technical Teachers' Training College (NTTTC) and Institute for Promotion of Science Education and Training (IPSET) respectively. In 1997, both were merged and renamed as the National Institute of Science and Technical Education (NISTE) and declared it under the office of the then Ministry of Education.

In 2010, after the 18th amendment in the Constitution, NISTE was upgraded into Degree Awarding Institute (DAI) to offer various undergraduate and graduate-level engineering technologies programs.

The Parliament of Pakistan approved the Act to upgrade NISTE into National Skills University, Islamabad on March 7, 2018. The President of Pakistan approved NSU Charter on March 12, 2018.

Rankings 
National Skills University Islamabad is ranked for UI GreenMetric 732 among renown universities in the world and 393 in Asia region.

Faculties and Departments 
National Skills University offers certificate and Degree courses to students. University has following faculties with their respective departments.

Faculty of Building Technology and Built Environment 
 Department of Civil Engineering Technology

Faculty of Electro-Technology 
 Department of Electrical Engineering Technology

Faculty of Mechanical and Automotive Technology 
 Department of Mechanical Engineering Technology

Faculty of Computing and Information Technology 
 Department of Information Engineering Technology

Faculty of Management and Communication Studies 
 Department of Management Sciences

Faculty of Basic Science and Humanities 
 Department of General Studies
 Department of Medical Laboratory Technology

References

External links
Official website

Universities and colleges in Islamabad
Public universities and colleges in Pakistan
Islamabad Capital Territory
Educational institutions established in 2021
2021 establishments in Pakistan